Cirknica is a dispersed settlement in the Slovene Hills south of Šentilj v Slovenskih Goricah in the Municipality of Šentilj in northeastern Slovenia.

References

External links 
Cirknica on Geopedia

Populated places in the Municipality of Šentilj